Jose Carlos Sebastián Gómez Maraschio (born May 20, 1983, in Mar del Plata, Argentina), professionally known as Piru Sáez, is an Argentine actor and rock singer. He is the best known of portraying Rocco Fuentes Echagüe in Rebelde Way and Piru in Floricienta and El Refugio (de los Sueños), and being a member of musical group Rolabogan. Currently he is the singer of the Latin rock bands Coverheads and FOXLEY. Actually, the artist are working in a new album to release on 2023.

Filmography

Television
 La opportunidad de tu vida (Sorpresa y 1/2, 2002) - Piru Sáez
 Rebelde Way (2003) as Rocco Fuentes Echagüe
 Floricienta (2004) as Piru
 El Refugio (de los Sueños) (2006) as Piru
 Champs 12 (2009, episodes 8-9) as Ciru

Discography

With Rolabogan

Albums
 2006: Rolabogan

Singles
 2006: "Bailo"
 2006: "Motivos"
 2006: "Cada Puesta de Sol"

Solo singles
 2003: "Nada Que Hablar"
 2003: "Te dejé"

With Diecis1e7e

Albums
 2008: Diecis1e7e

Singles
 2007 "Identidad"
 2007: "Euforia"
 2007: "Inercia"
 2007: "Gris"
 2007: "Mañanas"
 2007: "Hoy ya no es hoy"
 2007: "Ayeres"
 2007: "Instante"
 2007: "Sentidos paralelos"
 2007: "Bombas sobre mi"
 2007: "Canción de luz"
 2007: "Zöe"

Covers
 2007: "Lunes por la madrugada" (Abuelos de la nada)
 2007: "Persiana americana" (Soda Stereo)

With Coverheads

Albums
2012: Rock Cinco Estrellas

Singles

 2012: Mujer de Fuego
 2012: Nunca Sera Suficiente
 2012: Creo En Milagros
 2012: Que Me Queda
 2012: Juego Cruel
 2012: Flores Muertas
 2012: Rebell Yell
 2012: Aca Tenes
 2012: Dame Tu Amor
 2012: Helter Skelter
 2012: Que Haces Por Dinero Nena?
 2012: No Te Vayas Mal

With Foxley

Albums
2014: NUEVA GENERACIÓN

2018: WOW

Singles

 2014: Donde Va a Parar
 2014: Me Gusta
 2014: Sin Vos
 2014: La Paz
 2014: Doble Vida
 2014: Nueva Generación
 2014: Derroche de Amor
 2014: Siempre Estaba Ahí
 2014: El Rey
 2014: Primero Prefiero
 2020: Nada
 2020: Está vez ft: Emanero 
 2020: Mar del Plata
 2021: Fluye
2021: Tanto y Mucho

External links

References 

1983 births
Living people
Argentine male television actors
21st-century Argentine male actors
People from Mar del Plata
Argentine rock singers
21st-century Argentine  male singers